David Patrick Gedge MBE FRCO (1 March 1939 – 2 July 2016) was an organist based in England and Wales.

Life

He was born on 12 March 1939. He was a chorister in Southwark Cathedral from 1947 - 1962, and educated in St Olave's Grammar School in London, the Royal Academy of Music, and the University of London.

He was awarded the Turpin Prize in 1962 when he achieved his FRCO. He was made a MBE in 1996, and received the Archbishop of Wales award for church music in 1997.

He has written two autobiographies A Country Cathedral Organist Looks Back and More From a Country Cathedral Organist. Both autobiographies were self-published and received mixed reviews.

Sadly David died on Saturday 2 July 2016.

Appointments

Organist of St. Mary the Virgin, Primrose Hill, London 1957 - 1962
Organist of Selby Abbey 1962 - 1966
Director of Music at Brecon Cathedral 1966 - 2007, where his wife Hazel held the position of Assistant Organist.

References

1939 births
Alumni of the Royal College of Music
Alumni of the University of London
Cathedral organists
English organists
British male organists
English composers
English autobiographers
Fellows of the Royal College of Organists
Members of the Order of the British Empire
Living people
People educated at St Olave's Grammar School
21st-century organists
21st-century British male musicians
Male classical organists